Rafael 'Rafa' Gómez Llorens (born 23 May 1983) is a Spanish footballer who plays as a forward.

Club career
Gómez was born in Alicante, Valencian Community. After five years at local Elche CF where he did not receive one single first-team opportunity, he played in the following years mostly in the fourth division, but also spent some months in the fifth with Torrellano Illice CF, also in his native region.

In the summer of 2009, after helping CD Alcoyano to the (unsuccessful) promotion playoffs to the second level, Gómez signed a two-year deal with first club Elche, with the side in that same tier. Two years later, he returned to his previous team.

References

External links

1983 births
Living people
Footballers from Alicante
Spanish footballers
Association football forwards
Segunda División players
Segunda División B players
Tercera División players
Divisiones Regionales de Fútbol players
Elche CF Ilicitano footballers
Yeclano CF players
Caudal Deportivo footballers
CD Alcoyano footballers
Elche CF players
CP Cacereño players
CD Badajoz players
CD Torrevieja players